Jamie Farnworth (born 14 January 1982) is a Greek softball player. She competed in the women's tournament at the 2004 Summer Olympics.

References

External links
 

1982 births
Living people
Greek softball players
Olympic softball players of Greece
Softball players at the 2004 Summer Olympics
Sportspeople from San Bernardino, California
Softball players from California